Chalicorus is a genus of beetles in the family Melyridae.

References

External links 

 
 Chalicorus at insectoid.info

Cleroidea genera
Melyridae